Bird and Diz is a studio album by jazz saxophonist Charlie Parker and trumpeter Dizzy Gillespie. It was recorded primarily on June 6, 1950, in New York City. Two tracks featured on the original pressing, "Passport" and "Visa", were recorded by Parker, without Gillespie and with different personnel than the other tracks, in March and May 1949. The album was originally issued in 1952 in 10" format as a collection of 78 rpm singles on the Verve subsidiary label Clef Records.

Although produced by Norman Granz, known for large ensembles at the time, the album contains compositions performed with the standard bebop instrumentation of saxophone, trumpet, piano, bass, and drums. In a 1952 four-star review of Bird and Diz, a DownBeat magazine columnist wrote of Granz's contribution to the album's sound, stating "Though there is no mention of bop in Norman Granz'[s] notes, we owe him a salvo for reminding us through this LP that this music is still very much alive." It is the final collaborative studio recording by Parker and Gillespie, and has been reissued several times by Verve and PolyGram Records.

Track listing 
Included on the original LP, "Passport" and "Visa" were omitted from the reissue because they were not recorded during the 1950 Bird and Diz session.

Side one

Side two

CD reissue 
The Verve/PolyGram remaster editions feature 18 additional takes and liner notes by music scholar James Patrick and producer Norman Granz.

 "Bloomdido" – 3:25
 "My Melancholy Baby" – 3:24
 "Relaxin' with Lee" – 2:47
 "Leap Frog" – 2:29
 "An Oscar for Treadwell" – 3:23
 "Mohawk" – 3:36
 "My Melancholy Baby (Complete Take)" – 3:17
 "Relaxin' With Lee (Take 4  Complete Take)" – 3:56
 "Leap Frog (Take 11  Complete Take)" – 2:34
 "Leap Frog (Take 8  Complete Take)" – 2:02
 "Leap Frog (Take 9  Complete Take)" – 2:06
 "An Oscar for Treadwell (Take 4  Complete Take)" – 3:21
 "Mohawk (Take 3  Complete Take)" – 3:48
 "Relaxin' With Lee (Take 1  Breakdown Take)" – 0:17
 "Relaxin' With Lee (Take 2  Breakdown Take)" – 1:08
 "Relaxin' With Lee (Take 3  False Start)" – 0:04
 "Relaxin' With Lee (Take 5  Breakdown Take)" – 0:24
 "Leap Frog (Take 1  Breakdown Take)" – 0:26
 "Leap Frog (Take 7  Breakdown Take)" – 0:14
 "Leap Frog (Take 10  Breakdown Take)" – 0:40
 "Leap Frog (Take 2  Breakdown Take)" – 0:18
 "Leap Frog (Take 6  Breakdown Take)" – 0:20
 "Leap Frog (Take 4  Breakdown Take)" – 0:13
 "Leap Frog (Take 3  Breakdown Take)" – 0:41

Personnel

Musicians 
 Charlie Parker - saxophone  (Complete Album)
 Dizzy Gillespie - trumpet (except tracks A4 & B4)
 Curley Russell - bass (except on tracks A4 & B4)
 Buddy Rich - drums (except tracks A4 & B4)
 Thelonious Monk - piano (except tracks A4 & B4)
 Tommy Potter - bass (on tracks A4 & B4)
 Carlos Vidal - bongo (on track B4)
 Max Roach - drums (tracks A4 & B4)
 Al Haig - piano (tracks A4 & B4)
 Tommy Turk - trombone (track B4)
 Kenny Dorham - trumpet (tracks A4 & B4)

Production 
 Norman Granz - producer
 Dennis Drake - mastering
 David Stone Martin - cover design

References 
Footnotes

 Bibliography
 Personnel/recorded date/master numbers confirmed with the Ruppli's discography.

External links 
 

1952 albums
Charlie Parker albums
Dizzy Gillespie albums
Verve Records albums
Albums produced by Norman Granz
Albums with cover art by David Stone Martin
Clef Records albums